The 1948 Washington Huskies football team was an American football team that represented the University of Washington during the 1948 college football season. In its first season under head coach Howard Odell, the team compiled a 2–7–1 record, finished in seventh place in the Pacific Coast Conference, and was outscored 189 to 89. Alf Hemsted was the team captain.

Schedule

Professional football draft selections
One University of Washington Husky was selected in the 1949 AAFC Draft, which lasted 29 rounds with 136 selections.

References

External links
 Game program: Washington at Washington State – October 16, 1948

Washington
Washington Huskies football seasons
Washington Huskies football